Mynachdy is a district of the city of Cardiff, Wales. Mynachdy is situated between Gabalfa, Birchgrove and Cathays. Mynachdy is often paired with neighbouring Gabalfa, and shares its councillors. It is close to a few universities such as Cardiff University and the Royal Welsh College of Music & Drama, as well as student accommodation.

Name 
The word "mynachdy" comes from the Welsh words "mynach" (monk) and "tŷ" (house). This probably refers to Llys Talybont, a manor building in the modern area of Mynachdy that was owned by the monks of Llantarnam Abbey.

Mynachdy Institute 
The Mynachdy Institute is a community centre in Mynachdy. There have been many threats of closure, with plans to replace it with student flats. However, after its initial closure, a successful community movement regained control of the Institute from Cardiff Council.

Transport 
The A470 North Road runs along Mynachdy's northeast side.

Mynachdy is bordered on its southwest side by a local railway line. There are plans under consideration to build the Gabalfa railway station on this line to serve Mynachdy and neighbouring Gabalfa.

References 

Districts of Cardiff